Jalloul "Chico" Bouchikhi (born 1954 in Arles) is a musician and a co-founder of the Gipsy Kings. He later left the Gipsy Kings and founded Chico & the Gypsies.

Early life 

Bouchikhi was born in Arles, France to a Moroccan father and an Algerian mother. He was married to Marthe Reyes, the daughter of José Reyes, the father of the Reyes sons, members of the group Gipsy Kings.

Personal life 
His brother, Ahmed Bouchiki, was assassinated by Mossad agents in the Norwegian town of Lillehammer in July 1973 in the Lillehammer affair. Bouchikhi, a waiter, had been mistaken for Ali Hassan Salameh.

He is also UNESCO's special envoy for peace, and has held a major concert in Israel with his band. He has also played before Shimon Peres and Yasser Arafat during the Oslo Accords peace negotiations.

In 2014 Bouchikhi visited Israel. When asked in an interview with The Independent about his decision to refuse to participate in a boycott of the country, he insisted that reconciliation was more important than holding grudges.

Discography

As part of the Gipsy Kings
1982: Allegria
1983: Luna de Fuego 
1988: Gipsy Kings 
1989: Mosaïque

As part of Chico & the Gypsies
Refer to discography section of Chico & the Gypsies

See also

References

External links

Artist home page
Chico's History 

Gipsy Kings members
1954 births
People from Arles
Moroccan musicians
Algerian musicians
Moroccan people of Algerian descent
French people of Moroccan descent
French people of Algerian descent
Living people
French jazz guitarists
French male guitarists
French male jazz musicians
Spanish male musicians